Lidl Stiftung & Co. KG  is a German international discount retailer chain that operates over 11,000 stores across Europe and the United States. Headquartered in Neckarsulm, Baden-Württemberg, the company belongs to the Schwarz Group, which also operates the hypermarket chain Kaufland.

Lidl is the chief competitor of the similar German discount chain Aldi in several markets. There are Lidl stores in every member state of the European Union as well as in Serbia, Switzerland, the United Kingdom and the United States.

History

In 1932, Josef Schwarz became a partner in Südfrüchte Großhandlung Lidl & Co., a fruit wholesaler, and he developed the company into a general food wholesaler.

In 1977, under his son Dieter Schwarz, the Schwarz-Gruppe began to focus on discount markets, larger supermarkets, and cash and carry wholesale markets. Dieter did not want to use the name Schwarz-Markt (literally "black market") and wanted to use the name of his father's former business partner, A. Lidl, but legal reasons prevented him from using that name for his discount stores. When he discovered a newspaper article about a painter and retired schoolteacher Ludwig Lidl, he bought the rights to the name from him for 1,000 German marks.

Lidl is part of the Schwarz Group, the fifth-largest retailer in the world with sales of €104.3 billion (2018).

The first Lidl discount store was opened in 1973, copying the Aldi concept. Schwarz rigorously removed merchandise that did not sell from the shelves, and cut costs by keeping the size of the retail outlets as small as possible. By 1977, the Lidl chain comprised 33 discount stores.

Lidl opened its first UK store in 1994. Its grocery market share in the UK was 5.9% in 2019.

Sven Seidel was appointed CEO of the company in March 2014, after the previous CEO Karl-Heinz Holland stepped down. Holland had served as chief executive since 2008 but left due to undisclosed "unbridgeable" differences over future strategy. Seidel stepped down from his position in February 2017 after Manager Magazin reported he had fallen out of favour with Klaus Gehrig, who has headed the Schwarz Group since 2004.  Seidel was succeeded as CEO by Dane Jesper Højer, previously head of Lidl's international buying operation.

In June 2015, the company announced it would establish a United States headquarters in Arlington, Virginia. Lidl has major distribution centers in Mebane, North Carolina, and Spotsylvania County, Virginia. The company initially focused on opening locations in East Coast states, between Pennsylvania and Georgia, and as far west as Ohio. In June 2017, Lidl opened its first stores in the United States in Virginia Beach, Virginia and other mid-Atlantic cities. The company planned to open a total of one hundred U.S. stores by the summer of 2018. In November 2018, Lidl announced plans to acquire 27 Best Market stores in New York and New Jersey.  In December 2018, Lidl opened its first location in New York City, in the Staten Island Mall. Lidl has plans to phase out the selling of cigarettes in all its Dutch stores by 2024 as part of the 'smoke free generation'.The company has continued to expand throughout the eastern U.S., with over 100 stores by the end of 2020. In August 2020, Lidl announced that it planned to open up another 50 stores in the U.S. by the end of 2021.

Business model

Like fellow German supermarket Aldi, Lidl has a zero waste, no-frills, "pass-the-savings-to-the-consumer" approach of displaying most products in their original delivery cartons, allowing the customers to take the product directly from the carton. When the carton is empty, it is simply replaced with a full one. Staffing is minimal.

In contrast to Aldi, there are generally more branded products offered. Lidl distributes many low-priced gourmet foods by producing each of them in a single European Union country for its whole worldwide chain, but it also sources many local products from the country where the store is located. Like Aldi, Lidl has special weekly offers, and its stock of non-food items often changes with time. In contrast to Aldi, Lidl advertises extensively in its homeland of Germany.

Just as Aldi, Lidl does not play mood music in most countries, including Germany. Exceptions include stores in the United States, Croatia, Spain (not all), Poland and Lithuania. Additionally, in two stores in Denmark music is played as a test. Lidl stores have PA systems for important announcements but do not broadcast commercials.

The Lidl operation in the United Kingdom took a different approach than in Germany, with a focus on marketing and public relations, and providing employee benefits not required by law, including paying the independently verified living wage and offering a staff discount. Upmarket products were introduced, especially in the lead-up to Christmas. This required significant investment in marketing to produce sales growth but had an effect on Lidl's logistical operation and pressure on profits. Ronny Gottschlich, who had run Lidl GB for the six years to 2016, was responsible for this approach, which led to friction with head office, due to the cost involved. In September 2016, Gottschlich unexpectedly left and was replaced by the Austrian sales and operations director, German-national Christian Härtnagel. Lidl continued to have ambitious investment plans in the United Kingdom, ultimately doubling the number of stores to 1,500. In the financial year of 2015, Lidl Great Britain's revenue from its over 630 stores throughout Britain was £4.7 billion.

Criticism 
In 2008, Lidl was accused by journalists of spying on their workers, listening to private phone calls, and sometimes even following them home or to doctor's appointments. In one instance, an employee's file was supposedly annotated to note that most of her friends were "drug users". In another instance, a female worker at a Lidl store in the Czech Republic was allegedly forbidden from using the toilet during working hours. An internal company memo from the incident was made public as part of a court case, in which the company is alleged to have advised management "Female workers who have their periods may go to the toilet now and again, but to enjoy this privilege they should wear a visible headband". Some trade union activists have compared this behavior to that of American companies which engage in union busting, drawing the comparison to surveillance techniques used to proactively detect and stop union organizing activity within a place of business. Lidl responded to these claims, stating that the surveillance was intended to prevent shoplifting, and to detect "abnormal behavior".

Lidl has also been accused by trade unions in Germany of shutting down stores when workers elect worker councils or opt to engage in collective bargaining with a trade union.

In October 2022, animal welfare NGOs across Europe accused Lidl of a ‘chicken scandal’. Investigation footage filmed on a Lidl supplier's farm in Germany showed sick and injured chickens unable to walk and lying in their own waste. In November 2022, another investigation was published showing similar conditions at Lidl supplier farms in Spain. Further investigations in Italy and Austria have also revealed severe chicken welfare issues. In the Austrian investigation footage, birds are seen attempting to eat the rotting carcasses of other dead chickens. The chickens in the footage are fast-growing breeds, which reach their kill weight in just 35 days and have higher levels of mortality, lameness and muscle disease than slower-growing breeds. NGOs have called on the supermarket to sign up to the Better Chicken Commitment (BCC), a set of welfare standards which prohibits the use of fast-growing breeds and requires the provision of more space and enrichment for chickens. While Lidl France already committed to the BCC in 2020, Lidl have so far not made a commitment for the rest of their European operations.

Stores

 Lidl has a presence with stores in 31 countries.

Former markets

Future markets

Other services 
In October 2009, Lidl Movies was launched in the United Kingdom, undercutting Tesco DVD Rental, which had previously been the United Kingdom's cheapest online rental service for DVDs. The service was powered by OutNow DVD Rental. OutNow went into liquidation in October 2011, taking Lidl Movies with it.

In January 2012, Lidl launched bakeries in their stores across Europe. They consist of a small baking area with a number of ovens, together with an area where bread and pastries, such as croissants, are displayed for sale. The bakeries were initially trialed in a limited number of stores, to determine whether there was a demand for freshly baked products in-store.

The mobile phone brand Lidl Connect was launched in Germany in October 2015 and in Austria and Switzerland in June and July 2019. 

As of May 2019, Lidl US has partnered with Boxed.com to test a home delivery service using the online retailer's technology. Lidl also partners with Target Corp. subsidiary Shipt for grocery home delivery.

Lidl also runs Representative Offices in China, Bangladesh, and Hong Kong, though there is no mention of Lidl stores opening in said countries. Their operations are likely limited to overseeing manufacturing contracts for most of non-food products, offered in Lidl stores, with local manufacturers based in these countries.

In April 2021, Lidl in Ireland started offering customers coupons to get free pads or tampons each month as an initiative against period poverty.

In March 2023, Lidl was announced as the sponsor of the 2023 World Cycling Championship held in Scotland.

In August 2018,  Lidl introduced "Lidl Plus" supermarket loyalty card via an app on the Apple App Store and Google Play Store. The app is available in most European countries that Lidl operates in, offering discounts on own brand products and on partner offers. The app also has, in several countries, a bonus program with cashback.

References

External links 
 The company's official US website 
 The company's official UK website
 Yahoo! — Lidl & Schwarz Stiftung & Co. KG Company Profile

Arts and crafts retailers
German companies established in 1930
Companies based in Baden-Württemberg
Companies based in Neckarsulm
Retail companies established in 1930
German brands
Supermarkets of Germany
Discount stores